The Gamester is a 1949 historical adventure novel by the Italian-born British writer Rafael Sabatini. It was his final published novel before his death the following year. The plot revolves around the life of the Scottish financier John Law who created a large boom in France during the early eighteenth century.

References

Bibliography
 Hoppenstand, Gary. Perilous Escapades: Dimensions of Popular Adventure Fiction. McFarland, 2018.
 Orel, Harold. The Historical Novel from Scott to Sabatini: Changing Attitudes toward a Literary Genre, 1814-1920. Springer, 1995.

1949 British novels
British adventure novels
British historical novels
Novels set in the 18th century
Novels set in France
Novels by Rafael Sabatini
Hutchinson (publisher) books